The 1962 Soviet Chess Championship was the 30th edition of USSR Chess Championship. Held from 21 November to 20 December 1962 in Yerevan. The tournament was won by Viktor Korchnoi. It was preceded by six semifinals events at Dnipropetrovsk, Novosibirsk, Riga and three of which were simultaneously the finals of the
championships of the sports societies Spartak, Trud and Burevestnik.

Table and results

References 

USSR Chess Championships
Championship
Chess
1962 in chess
Chess